The Australian pavilion houses Australia's national representation during the Venice Biennale arts festivals.

Background

Organization and building 

The Australian pavilion was designed in 1987 by the Australia Council's Design Arts Board and constructed by 1988. The two-level single exhibition space includes a veranda-style entrance with a courtyard constructed around a pre-existing tree. This connection between internal space and landscape was designed to relate to architectural themes in Australia. The curvature of the pavilion's sheet metal roof is meant to invoke a wave.

The original Australian Pavilion, designed by Philip Cox to be a temporary structure of fiber cement and steel, was opened in 1988 at the western edge of the Giardini. Italian-born Australian industrialist Franco Belgiorno-Nettis had previously lobbied so successfully that in 1988 Australia beat 16 other countries to the last site on which to build a permanent pavilion in the Giardini. Cox and other generous donors gifted the pavilion to the Commonwealth Government. The pavilion was not heritage protected because of its temporary status. A new, permanent pavilion was designed by architectural practice Denton Corker Marshall and completed in 2015. Built from concrete and steel, the two-story structure contains 240 square meters of exhibition space and the exterior is covered in black granite from Zimbabwe. 
Australia's participation at the Venice Biennale is managed by the Australia Council for the Arts. However, all of the A$6 million ($6.04 million) originally needed for the new building were to be raised from the private sector. Eventually, the pavilion cost $7.5 million to build, $1 million of which was funded by the Australia Council for the Arts; the rest was donated by 82 private Australian donors, including actress Cate Blanchett and producer Santo Cilauro.

Representation by year

Art 
Australians exhibiting for Great Britain:
 1897 — Grosvenor Thomas
 1907 — Charles Conder, Grosvenor Thomas
 1909 — George Lambert, Grosvenor Thomas
 1910 — George Lambert, Arthur Streeton, Albert Henry Fullwood, Grosvenor Thomas, Harold Parker
 1912 — George Lambert, Thea Proctor, Arthur Streeton, Tom Roberts, Hayley Lever, Albert Henry Fullwood, Fred Leist
 1914 — George Lambert, Arthur Streeton
 1936 — Derwent Lees (posthumously)

Australians exhibiting for Australia:
 1954 — Sidney Nolan, Russell Drysdale, William Dobell
 1956 — Albert Tucker
 1958 — Arthur Streeton, Arthur Boyd
 1978 — Ken Unsworth, John Davis, Robert Owen
 1980 — Mike Parr, Tony Coleing, Kevin Mortensen (Curator: Penny Coleing)
 1982 — Peter Booth, Rosalie Gascoigne
 1984 — no participation
 1986 — Imants Tillers (Curator: Kerry Crowley)

Australians exhibiting in the Australian Pavilion:
 1988 — Arthur Boyd (Curator: Grazia Gunn) (Peter Tyndall was exhibited in the Arsenale)
 1990 — Trevor Nickolls, Rover Thomas 
 1993 — Jenny Watson  (Curator: Judy Annear)
 1995 — Bill Henson (Curator: Isobel Crombie)
 1997 — Judy Watson, Yvonne Koolmatrie, Emily Kngwarreye (Curators: Hetti Perkins, Brenda L Croft, Victoria Lynn)
 1999 — Howard Arkley (Curator: Timothy Morrell)
 2001 — Lyndal Jones (Curator: John Barret-Lennard)
 2003 — Patricia Piccinini (Curator: Linda Michael)
 2005 — Ricky Swallow (Curator: Charlotte Day)
 2007 — Callum Morton, Susan Norrie, Daniel von Sturmer
 2009 — Shaun Gladwell, Vernon Ah Kee, Ken Yonetani, Claire Healy and Sean Cordeiro (Curator: Felicity Fenner)
 2011 — Hany Armanious (Curator: Anne Ellegood)
 2013 — Simryn Gill (Curator: Catherine de Zegher)
 2015 — Fiona Margaret Hall (Curator: Linda Michael)
 2017 — Tracey Moffatt (Curator: Natalie King)
 2019 — Angelica Mesiti (Curator: Juliana Engberg)
 2022 — Marco Fusinato (Curator: Alexie Glass-Kantor)
 2024 — Archie Moore (Curator: Ellie Buttrose)

References

Bibliography

Further reading 

 
 
 
 

National pavilions
Australian contemporary art